Rubén Dario Limardo Gascón (born August 3, 1985) is a Venezuelan left-handed épée fencer, five-time team Pan American champion, four-time individual Pan American champion, three-time Olympian, and 2012 individual Olympic champion.

Limardo competed in the 2012 London Olympic Games, the 2016 Rio de Janeiro Olympic Games, and the 2020 Tokyo Olympic Games.

His younger brother, Francisco, also competes in fencing on the international level. In 2015 he was elected to the National Assembly for the United Socialist Party of Venezuela.

Olympics
Born in Ciudad Bolívar, Limardo competed for his native country in the 2008 Olympics épée competition, placing 23rd.

Limardo competed at the 2012 Summer Olympics in London winning a gold medal in the individual épée event at the ExCeL Exhibition Centre on 1 August, two days before his 27th birthday. He won the gold when he defeated Norway's Bartosz Piasecki 15–10 in the men's épée final, winning Venezuela's first ever fencing medal, and Latin America's first Olympic gold medal in épée in 108 years, after Ramón Fonst won the event in 1904.

Limardo earned Venezuela's second gold medal in any Olympic Games with the first being at the 1968 Summer Olympic Games when Francisco Rodríguez won gold as a boxer in the light flyweight division.

He competed at the 2016 Summer Olympics in Rio de Janeiro in the individual épée and the team épée competition. In the individual event, he was defeated by Ayman Mohamed Fayez of Egypt during the round of 32. He was the flagbearer for Venezuela during the opening ceremony.

Fencing background
Limardo began fencing at the age of seven, encouraged by an uncle who had discovered the sport in Hungary. He was originally a right-handed foil fencer before injury caused him to switch both hand and weapon.

He was awarded the Venezuelan Order of the Liberator after winning his gold medal at the London Olympic Games. President Hugo Chávez also presented him with a gold replica of Simon Bolivar's sword encrusted with precious stones.

His brother Jesús Limardo also competes in fencing competitions. He has been a member of Piast Gliwice fencing club and currently resides in Łódź, Poland.

Medal Record

Olympic Games

World Championship

Pan American Championship

Grand Prix

World Cup

References

External links
Rubén Limardo at BBC Sport
Rubén Limardo at NBC Olympics
Rubén Limardo at FIE

1985 births
Living people
People from Ciudad Bolívar
Venezuelan épée fencers
Venezuelan male épée fencers
Olympic fencers of Venezuela
Fencers at the 2007 Pan American Games
Fencers at the 2008 Summer Olympics
Fencers at the 2011 Pan American Games
Fencers at the 2012 Summer Olympics
Fencers at the 2016 Summer Olympics
Olympic gold medalists for Venezuela
Olympic medalists in fencing
Medalists at the 2012 Summer Olympics
Pan American Games gold medalists for Venezuela
Pan American Games silver medalists for Venezuela
Pan American Games medalists in fencing
Central American and Caribbean Games gold medalists for Venezuela
Central American and Caribbean Games silver medalists for Venezuela
Central American and Caribbean Games bronze medalists for Venezuela
Competitors at the 2006 Central American and Caribbean Games
Competitors at the 2010 Central American and Caribbean Games
South American Games gold medalists for Venezuela
South American Games medalists in fencing
Competitors at the 2010 South American Games
Fencers at the 2019 Pan American Games
Central American and Caribbean Games medalists in fencing
World Fencing Championships medalists
Medalists at the 2019 Pan American Games
Medalists at the 2011 Pan American Games
Fencers at the 2020 Summer Olympics
21st-century Venezuelan people